Wangsu Science & Technology Co., Ltd. (Chinese: 网宿科技股份有限公司) is a China-based company that provides content delivery network (CDN) and Internet data center (IDC) services. It was founded in 2000 and listed on the Shenzhen Stock Exchange in 2009.

It operates businesses in China as ChinaNetCenter Co., and overseas markets as Quantil, Inc. for CDN services and Quantil Networks, Inc. for IDC services.

Corporate affairs
The largest shareholder is Chen Baozhen, who co-founded one of the predecessor companies of Wangsu, holding 21% of the shares of the company.

Its Chinese domestic markets are divided into East China, South China, North China, Central China, the western region and the northeast region.

Acquisitions
In February 2017, the company announced its acquisition of South Korean competitor CDNetworks for 21.1 billion yen ($185 million) to continue expanding its network and business operations outside of China. The deal involved purchasing 85% percent of CDNetworks’ shares from KDDI.

References

External links

Content delivery networks
Companies listed on the Shenzhen Stock Exchange
Internet technology companies of China
Companies based in Beijing
Chinese companies established in 2000
Computer companies established in 2008